Ādaži (formerly ) is a town in Pierīga, on the left bank of the Gauja river. The town is the administrative center of Ādaži Municipality. It is located by the highway A1, 21.6 km from the center of Riga.

Ādaži has administrative offices, schools (Ādaži Elementary School, Ādaži Secondary School, and Ādaži Free Waldorf School), Kindergarten Strautins, several shops (Maxima, Rimi, Elvi) and service companies. Latvia's longest river Gauja flows along the Ādaži River, and its tributary Vējupe divides town into two parts.

Ādaži also has an eponymous wakeboarding club on the Gauja.

The town is mostly known due to the nearby Latfood factory producing Ādažu Čipsi, the best known potato chip brand in Latvia.

History 
The castle of Neuermühlen has been documented since at least 1204.

Here the Battle of Neuermühlen took place in 1492. After the battle the Bishop of Riga has to recognize the Teutonic Order as Overlord of Livonia.

The modern village of Ādaži is formed around the center of the former Gauja Manor ( Aahof ) or the Gauja-Plava Manor, but the newest part of the village Vejupe on the right bank - around the center of the Remberg manor (Ringenberg). Gauja Manor was located in the ancient Bukultu and Baltezers areas. territory, in the 19th century it was called Ādaži-Carnikava Parish.

According to the provisions of the 2021 Latvian administrative reform, Ādaži gained city rights (town status) on 1 July 2022.

Military installations 
There is also a training camp of the Latvian Army in Ādaži. In September 2016, Latvia's Defence Minister Raimonds Bergmanis said infrastructure at the base was "being constructed and modernized at a fast pace" in preparation for a Canadian-led 1,500 strong multi-national NATO battalion expected to deploy to Latvia in the spring of 2017.

Transportation 
Ādaži location  on the A1 road (Latvia), part of Via Baltica international highway favors transit and transport industries.

See also 
 Ādaži Protected Landscape

References

External links 
 Ādaži official site

Ādaži Municipality
Towns in Latvia
Castles of the Teutonic Knights
Kreis Riga